is a train station in the city of Komoro, Nagano, Japan, operated by East Japan Railway Company (JR East).

Lines
Higashi-Komoro Station is served by the Koumi Line and is 77.4 kilometers from the terminus of the line at Kobuchizawa Station.

Station layout
The station consists of one ground-level side platform serving a single bi-directional track. There is no station building, but only a shelter on the platform. The station is unattended.

History
Higashi-Komoro Station opened on 10 July 1952. With the privatization of Japanese National Railways (JNR) on 1 April 1987, the station came under the control of JR East.

Surrounding area

See also
 List of railway stations in Japan

References

External links

 JR East station information 

Railway stations in Nagano Prefecture
Railway stations in Japan opened in 1952
Stations of East Japan Railway Company
Koumi Line
Komoro, Nagano